The Shin River is a river in New Zealand's Marlborough Region.

See also
List of rivers of New Zealand

References

Rivers of the Marlborough Region
Rivers of New Zealand